Circovirus is a genus of viruses, in the family Circoviridae. Birds (such as pigeons and ducks) and  pigs serve as natural hosts, though dogs have been shown to be infected as well. It is a single stranded DNA virus (ssDNA). There are 49 species in this genus. Some members of this genus cause disease: PCV-1 is non pathogenic, while PCV-2 causes postweaning multisystemic wasting syndrome (PMWS).

Taxonomy
The following species are recognized:

Barbel circovirus
Bat associated circovirus 1
Bat associated circovirus 2
Bat associated circovirus 3
Bat associated circovirus 4
Bat associated circovirus 5
Bat associated circovirus 6
Bat associated circovirus 7
Bat associated circovirus 8
Bat associated circovirus 9
Bat associated circovirus 10
Bat associated circovirus 11
Bat associated circovirus 12
Bat associated circovirus 13
Beak and feather disease virus
Bear circovirus
Canary circovirus
Canine circovirus
Chimpanzee associated circovirus 1
Civet circovirus
Duck circovirus
Elk circovirus
European catfish circovirus
Finch circovirus
Goose circovirus
Gull circovirus
Human associated circovirus 1 (HCirV-1)
Mink circovirus
Mosquito associated circovirus 1
Penguin circovirus
Pigeon circovirus
Porcine circovirus 1
Porcine circovirus 2
Porcine circovirus 3
Porcine circovirus 4
Raven circovirus
Rodent associated circovirus 1
Rodent associated circovirus 2
Rodent associated circovirus 3
Rodent associated circovirus 4
Rodent associated circovirus 5
Rodent associated circovirus 6
Rodent associated circovirus 7
Starling circovirus
Swan circovirus
Tick associated circovirus 1
Tick associated circovirus 2
Whale circovirus
Zebra finch circovirus

Structure
Viruses in Circovirus are non-enveloped, with icosahedral and round geometries, and T=1 symmetry. The diameter is around 17 nm. Genomes are circular and non-segmented.

The virions of Circoviruses are surprisingly small, with diameters ranging from 17 up to 22 nm.

Life cycle
Viral replication is nuclear. Entry into the host cell is achieved by penetration. Replication follows the ssDNA rolling circle model. DNA templated transcription, with some alternative splicing mechanism is the method of transcription. The virus exits the host cell by nuclear egress, and  nuclear pore export.
Birds and  pigs serve as the natural host. Transmission routes are fecal-oral and parental.

References

External links
 Viralzone: Circovirus
 ICTV
Circovirus – MicrobeWiki

Circoviridae
Virus genera